ι Crucis, Latinized as Iota Crucis, is a wide double star in the southern constellation of Crux. It is visible to the naked eye as a faint, orange-hued point of light with an apparent visual magnitude of 4m.69. This object is located 125 light-years from the Sun, based on parallax, and is drifting further away with a radial velocity of +7.5 km/s.

The primary component is an aging giant star with a stellar classification of K0 III. Having exhausted the supply of hydrogen at its core, the star has cooled and expanded off the main sequence, and now has over seven times the girth of the Sun. It is radiating 24 times the luminosity of the Sun from its swollen photosphere at an effective temperature of 4,824 K.

The Washington Double Star Catalog (2001) notes this is an "optical pair, based on study of relative motion of the components," whereas Eggleton and Tokovinin (2008) list it as a binary system.

References
 

K-type giants
Double stars

Crux (constellation)
Crucis, Iota
Durchmusterung objects
110829
062268
4842